ICCU is an acronym which may refer to:

Idaho Central Credit Union, American state-level credit union
International Cross Country Union, former governing body for cross country running
Intensive cardiac care unit, specialised medical location focused on heart issues
Istituto Centrale per il Catalogo Unico, an identifier